Chrysoclista is a genus of moths of the family Agonoxenidae described by Henry Tibbats Stainton in 1854.

Taxonomy
The genus is mostly placed in the family Agonoxenidae, but other authors list it as a member of the families Elachistidae, Cosmopterigidae or Momphidae.

Species
Chrysoclista abchasica (Sinev, 1986)
Chrysoclista basiflavella Matsumura, 1931
Chrysoclista cambiella (Busck, 1915)
Chrysoclista grandis Koster, 2002
Chrysoclista hygrophilella Viette, 1957
Chrysoclista lathamella T. B. Fletcher, 1936
Chrysoclista linneella (Clerck, 1759)
Chrysoclista monotyla Meyrick, 1921
Chrysoclista splendida Karsholt, 1997
Chrysoclista thrypsiphila Meyrick, 1912
Chrysoclista trilychna Meyrick, 1928
Chrysoclista villella (Busck, 1904)
Chrysoclista zagulajevi Sinev, 1979

References

Agonoxeninae
Moth genera
Taxa named by Henry Tibbats Stainton